Charlotte "Lotte" Auerbach FRS FRSE (14 May 1899 – 17 March 1994) was a German geneticist who contributed to founding the science of mutagenesis. She became well known after 1942 when she discovered with A. J. Clark and J. M. Robson that mustard gas could cause mutations in fruit flies. She wrote 91 scientific papers, and was a Fellow of the Royal Society of Edinburgh and of the Royal Society of London.

In 1976, she was awarded the Royal Society's Darwin Medal. Aside her scientific contributions and love of science, she was remarkable in many other ways, including her wide interests, independence, modesty, and transparent honesty.

Early life and education 
Charlotte Auerbach was born in Krefeld in Germany, the daughter of Selma Sachs and Friedrich Auerbach. She may have been influenced by the scientists in her family: her father Friedrich Auerbach (1870–1925) was a chemist, her uncle a physicist, and her grandfather, the anatomist Leopold Auerbach.

She studied biology and chemistry at the universities of Würzburg, Freiburg and Berlin. She was taught and inspired by Karl Michael Haider and Max Hartmann in Berlin, and later in Würzburg by Hans Kniep. After very good examinations in biology, chemistry, and physics, she initially decided to become a secondary-school teacher of science, passing the exams for that, with distinction in 1924.

She taught in Heidelberg (1924–1925) and briefly at the University of Frankfurt, from which she was dismissed – probably because she was Jewish. In 1928 she started postgraduate research at the Kaiser Wilhelm Institute for Biology (Berlin-Dahlem) in Developmental Physiology under Otto Mangold. In 1929 she abandoned her work with Mangold: he would later join the Nazi party, and Auerbach found his dictatorial manner unpleasant. In reply to her suggestion to change direction of her project, he replied "You are my student, you do as I say. What you think is of no consequence!".

She again taught biology in several schools in Berlin – until the Nazi party ended this by law as she was Jewish. Following her mother's advice, she left the country in 1933 and fled to Edinburgh where she got her PhD in 1935 at the Institute of Animal Genetics in the University of Edinburgh. She would stay affiliated to this Institute throughout her whole career.

Research career: Edinburgh
Auerbach's PhD dissertation was on the development of legs in Drosophila. After her dissertation she became a personal assistant to Francis Albert Eley Crew, who connected her to the lively group of scientists he had assembled, and to invited scientists including Julian Huxley, J.B.S. Haldane, and most importantly to Lotte, to Hermann Joseph Muller. The famous geneticist and mutation researcher stayed in Edinburgh 1938–1940 and introduced her to mutation research.

Initially, she refused to work with Muller when Crew told her to do so. Muller, however, who was present when she opposed her boss, assured her that he would only want to work with people who are interested in the projects. But since she was interested in how genes operate, Muller noted that to understand this it would be important to understand what happens if the genes are mutated – this convinced her. She said herself "His enthusiasm for mutation research was infectious and from that day on I switched to mutation research. I have never regretted it."

Auerbach's genetic mutation research remained unpublished for many years because the work with mustard gas was considered classified by the government. She was finally able to publish in 1947.

After being an assistant instructor in animal genetics, Auerbach became a lecturer in 1947, Professor of Genetics in 1967 and ended her professional career as a Professor Emeritus in 1969.

Teaching
While she found teaching at the schools sometimes difficult, she enjoyed teaching at the University and her lectures were models of clarity, usually delivered without any notes. She spoke with authority, but she did not mind questions, and allowed time for discussions.

She wrote several books to teach genetics, several of them were translated in other languages. Her book, Genetics in the Atomic Age (1956) was praised by The Bulletin of the Atomic Scientists for her excellent explanations of "an inherently technical matter."

Positions
She supported the Campaign for Nuclear Disarmament (CND), was a fierce opponent of apartheid, and a confirmed liberal. In 1947, she published a book of fairy stories titled Adventures with Rosalind under the pen-name of Charlotte Austen.

Personal life
Charlotte was an only child, born into a third-generation Jewish family who had lived for several generations in Breslau. Having fled Nazi Germany in 1933, she became a naturalised British citizen in 1939.

Auerbach never married and had no children of her own. She unofficially 'adopted' two boys. One, Michael Avern, was the child of a German-speaking companion to her own elderly mother, who had escaped to Britain as well. She helped to raise Michael. The other, Angelo Alecci, came from a poor Sicilian family and the Save the Children Fund connected Charlotte with him.

She was Jewish.

Later life and death
In 1989, aged 90, she gave her house in Edinburgh to Michael Avern and moved into the Abbeyfield Home in Polwarth Terrace, Edinburgh, which was operated by the church. She died there five years later, in 1994. She was cremated at Mortonhall Crematorium.

Awards, honors, and distinctions

 Keith Prize, Royal Society of Edinburgh (1947)
 Fellow of Royal Society of Edinburgh (1949)
 Fellow of the Royal Society (1957)
 Foreign Member, Danish Academy of Science (1968)
 Foreign Member, National Academy of Sciences (1970)
 Honorary degrees, Leiden University (1975), Trinity College, Dublin (1976), University of Cambridge (1976), Indiana University (1984)
 Darwin Medal, Royal Society (1976)
 Fellow, United Kingdom Environmental Mutagen Society (1978)
 Prix de d'Institut de la Vie (Fond, Electricité de France) (1982)
 Gregor Mendel Preis, German Genetical Society (1984)

The greatest reward for herself however was the telegram her hero Hermann Joseph Muller sent after their first striking mutant results in June 1941, which read: "We are thrilled by your major discovery opening great theoretical and practical field. Congratulations."

A room in the Royal Society of Edinburgh's building on George Street, Edinburgh is named for her.

There is a street named Charlotte-Auerbach-Straße in Stuhr-Brinkum. One of the streets in the Kings Buildings university complex in Edinburgh is named Charlotte Auerbach Road in her honour.

Works

Books

Auerbach C., 1961, 1964. The Science of Genetics. New Yoerk, Harper & Row.
Auerbach C., 1965. Notes for Introductory Courses in Genetics. Edinburgh: Kallman.
Auerbach C, 1976. Mutation Research: Problems, Results and Perspectives. London: Chapman & Hall.

Selected publications

Auerbach C., 1961. Chemicals and their effects. In: Symposium on Mutation and Plant Breeding, National Research Council Publication 891, 120–144. Washington DC: National Academy of Sciences.
Auerbach C., 1962. Mutation: An introduction to research on Mutagenesis. Part I. Methods. Edinburgh: Oliver & Boyd.

Auerbach C., 1963. Stages in the cell cycle and germ cell development. In: Radiation effects in Physics, Chemistry and Biology, edited by Ebert, M. & A. Howard, 152–168. Chicago Year Book Medical.

Citations

References

Women in the Biological Sciences: A Biobibliographic Sourcebook. Edited by LS Grinstein, CA Bierman, and RK Rose. Greenwood Press 1997.

Further reading
BBC Radio 4 In Our Time – GENETIC MUTATION – Steve Jones mentions Auerbach – streaming audio
Seltene Karriere einer Emigrantin, Die Wissenschaftlerin Charlotte Auerbach (1899–1994)

External links
 Geoffrey Beale, an entry about Charlotte Auerbach, Jewish Women: A Comprehensive Encyclopedia

1899 births
1994 deaths
People from Krefeld
German emigrants to Scotland
German geneticists
Jewish German scientists
Jewish emigrants from Nazi Germany to the United Kingdom
Scottish geneticists
Scottish zoologists
Scottish folklorists
Fellows of the Royal Society of Edinburgh
Academics of the University of Edinburgh
Members of the Royal Danish Academy of Sciences and Letters
Foreign associates of the National Academy of Sciences
Alumni of the University of Edinburgh
Women zoologists
Female Fellows of the Royal Society
20th-century American women scientists
20th-century American scientists
Scottish women scientists
German folklorists
Women folklorists
Jewish women scientists
20th-century German zoologists
American women academics
Auerbach family